Saint-Michel-des-Saints/Lac Kaiagamac Water Aerodrome  is located on Lac Kaiagamac,  south southeast of Saint-Michel-des-Saints, Quebec, Canada.

References

Airports in Lanaudière
Seaplane bases in Quebec